Selengiin Odkhüü (: * 4 May 1984) is a Mongolian international footballer. He made his first appearance for the Mongolia national football team in 2005 and has appeared for it 13 times.

International career

International goals
Scores and results list Mongolia's goal tally first.

References

1984 births
Mongolian footballers
Living people
Association football defenders
Mongolia international footballers